The British Columbia Electoral Boundaries Commission is an independent commission required to review and determine electoral district boundaries in the province of British Columbia, Canada. The Lieutenant Governor of British Columbia is required by the Electoral Boundaries Commission Act to a call a commission every two elections, consisting of a judge or a retired judge, the provincial Chief Electoral Officer, and another person (who may not be a Member of the Legislative Assembly).

The last re-distribution by the commission took place in 2015.  The next re-distribution is required to occur following the 2020 provincial election.  As of 2022, the Commission was holding public meetings throughout the province.

References

Politics of British Columbia